The Taiping Bridge is a historic stone arch bridge over the Eastern Zhejiang Canal in , Keqiao District of Shaoxing, Zhejiang, China.

History
The bridge was first built in 1620 during the Wanli era of the Ming dynasty (1368–1644), and rebuilt in 1858 during the reign of Xianfeng Emperor of the Qing dynasty (1644–1911).  

On 6 May 2013, it was listed among the seventh batch of "Major National Historical and Cultural Sites in Zhejiang" by the State Council of China.

Gallery

References

Bridges in Zhejiang
Arch bridges in China
Bridges completed in 1858
Qing dynasty architecture
Buildings and structures completed in 1858
1858 establishments in China
Major National Historical and Cultural Sites in Zhejiang